The Netball at the 2006 Commonwealth Games was the third Commonwealth Games tournament. The preliminary matches were held at the State Netball and Hockey Centre with the finals being held at the multi-purpose Melbourne Park in the inner city.

Netball was among the most popular sports with viewers at this Games, with most tickets selling out in the initial ballot, and no more being available until a second release in the week before the Games - a rare event in a competition where many tickets remained unsold in the final week before the start of competition.

Netball medal count

Qualification

Twelve teams qualified for the netball tournament. The host country, Australia, was granted automatic qualification. The top six world ranked netball countries (excluding the host country - New Zealand, Jamaica, England, South Africa, Samoa and Barbados) and one team from each of the IFNA's 5 regions - to be determined through regional qualifying tournaments conducted in accordance with the Rules and Regulations of IFNA.

Competition format
Twelve qualified nations were drawn into two groups, each consisting of six teams. Each game result merits a corresponding point:

The teams with the two highest points qualified for the knockout stage, which was a single-elimination tournament. The semifinal winners contested for the gold medal, while the losers played for the bronze medal.

Squads

Umpires
The IFNA named the following umpires to officiate the netball games at the 2006 Commonwealth Games.
  Anne Abraitis
  Bill Alexander
  Bobbi Brown
  Chris Campbell
  Stacey Campton
  Jacqui Jashari
  Marion Johnson-Hurley
  Sharon Kelly
  Bronwyn Meek
  Mandy Nottingham
  Justine Osbourne
  Michelle Phippard
Osbourne was later replaced with fellow New Zealander Pauline Sciascia.

Preliminary round

Group A

Group B

Classification

Eleventh place game

Ninth place game

Seventh place game

Fifth place game

Knockout round

Semifinals

Bronze medal match

Gold medal game

Statistical leaders

Team tournament highs

Total Goals

Goals from MPW

Match Play Winners

Penalties

Match Play Errors

Key: Rk - Rank, MP - Matches Played, SUS - Suspended Player, S - Success, A - Attempt, % - Goaling Percentage, MPW - Match Play Winner, INT - Intercept, DEF - Deflection, REA - Rebound Attack, RED - Rebound Defense, CON - Contact, OBS - Obstruction, STP - Stepping, BP - Bad Pass, HB - Held Ball, BCP - Breaking Centre Pass, OGE - Opposition Goal from Error

Individual tournament highs

Total Goals

Goals from MPW

Feed to Shooter

Match Play Winners

Nicole Aiken from Jamaica finished with an average 8.0 MPWs but only played two games.

Key: Rk - Rank, MP - Matches Played, SUS - Suspended Player, S - Success, A - Attempt, % - Goaling Percentage, MPW - Match Play Winner, INT - Intercept, DEF - Deflection, REA - Rebound Attack, RED - Rebound Defense

Medallists

References

External links 
 Official schedule and results
 Coverage from NetballOnline.com

 
2006
netball
2006 in netball
International netball competitions hosted by Australia
2006 in Australian netball
Netball in Victoria (Australia)